Rangsan Viwatchaichok, born January 22, 1979), simply known as Aon is a Thai professional football manager and former player, who is the manager of Thai League 1 club Police Tero.

He is a Thai retired professional footballer who plays as a defensive midfielder or a left back. He previously played for four other club teams in Thailand and Singapore. Rangsan is known for his set pieces.

International career
Rangsan has currently played 29 times for the senior Thailand national football team, and he has scored one goal in the process.

Managerial career
On 11 July 2013, BEC Tero Sasana sacked René Desaeyere and promoted Choketawee Promrut to be the club interim manager. Rangsan, who was the club captain, was also promoted to be the assistant coach.

On 9 August 2015, Rangsan was promoted to be the interim manager of BEC Tero Sasana after the removal of Kenny Shiels.

He had coached the club for three games before the appointment of Manuel Cajuda on 27 August.

On 1 December 2015, he was promoted to be the interim manager again after the resignation of Manuel Cajuda. Rangsan managed the club in the last three games of 2015 season with the record of 2 wins and 1 loss. The club set to relegate to Division 1 according to the final standing but still remained in top league after the withdraw of
Saraburi from the competition.

FOX Sports Asia reported in an article that Rangsan was appointed head coach of Police Tero following the exit of Englishman Scott Cooper in 2018.

International goals

Managerial statistics

Honours

Player
BEC Tero Sasana
 Thai Premier League: 2000
 Thai League Cup: 2014

Krung Thai Bank
 Thai Premier League: 2002–03, 2003–04

Buriram United
 Thai Premier League: 2008, 2011
 Thai FA Cup: 2011
 Thai League Cup: 2011

Manager
Police Tero
 Thai League 2 runner-up: 2019

Individual
Thai League 1 Coach of the Month: October 2022

References

External links
 
 

1984 births
Living people
Rangsan Viwatchaichok
Rangsan Viwatchaichok
Association football midfielders
Rangsan Viwatchaichok
Rangsan Viwatchaichok
Rangsan Viwatchaichok
Rangsan Viwatchaichok
Rangsan Viwatchaichok
Geylang International FC players
Rangsan Viwatchaichok
Rangsan Viwatchaichok
Rangsan Viwatchaichok
Singapore Premier League players
Rangsan Viwatchaichok
Rangsan Viwatchaichok
Expatriate footballers in Singapore
Rangsan Viwatchaichok
2004 AFC Asian Cup players
Rangsan Viwatchaichok